Ralf Falkenmayer (born 11 February 1963) is a German former professional footballer who played as a defensive midfielder.

Career
Falkenmayer made 385 Bundesliga appearances for Eintracht Frankfurt and Bayer Leverkusen. With Eintracht he won the DFB-Pokal in 1981 and with Bayer Leverkusen the UEFA Cup in 1988, despite missing his penalty in the shootout in the final.

For the West Germany national team he was capped four times between 1984 and 1986. He took part with West Germany at the Euro 1984 in France.

Honours
Eintracht Frankfurt
 DFB-Pokal: 1980–81Bayer Leverkusen'''
 UEFA Cup: 1987–88

References

External links
 
 
 

1963 births
Living people
Footballers from Frankfurt
German footballers
Association football midfielders
Germany international footballers
Germany under-21 international footballers
German football managers
Eintracht Frankfurt players
Bayer 04 Leverkusen players
SV Eintracht Trier 05 players
Bundesliga players
UEFA Euro 1984 players
UEFA Cup winning players
West German footballers